The sit-ups punishment (Uthak Baithak) is a form of punishment given in schools of Indian subcontinent, specially in India, Bangladesh, Sri Lanka, Nepal and Pakistan. In this punishment, one has to sit down and stand up continuously and count the number of sit-ups. Students do sit-ups while holding their ears with their hands. It is common in schools. For humiliation, it is done in front of other students. Normally given in the range of 10-300 sit up for boys and 10-200 sit up for girls.

Variants
There are many forms of this punishment.

Simple Situps
The punished student will do situps holding his/her ears. The hands should be ninety degrees with the body. Also he/she has to count loudly with every step. If the count is not hearable the term will repeat. Every term he/she has to sit fully so that his/her bottom touches the heals and to stand straight and if it is not so, he/she will have to start from the beginning. Inability to complete the prescribed number of situps could result in the student being caned by the punisher.

Criss-Cross Earholding
The punished student will hold his/her left ear with right hand and right ear with left hand and do sit ups(In back of head) . This may cause hardness, pain and humiliation to the punishment. It is widely implemented and also will have to this continuous.

Pairing Situps
There will be more than one punished and they will hold ears of one another and do the situps. This makes the punishment more hard as the punished have to take weight of the other. Also criss-cross  earholding can be applied here. Then it will be much harder to complete.

Situps touching heals
It is also variant used with the simple situps. Here the punished's heals should touch one another. This will cause friction between the knees for that he/she can fall. Criss-cross earholding can be applied here..

Doing sit up in sun
Doing situps in the sun is very hard to perform. There can be any form of sit ups as holding ears and doing, cris cross ear holding, heel touching or pairing sit ups or all

Timed sit up
This is very severe can be imposed to force the punished to do situps non-stop with no or minimal rest. This can be combined with any of the above forms. if punished is failed to complete the prescribed number of situps in given time, he/she has to start the punishment from beginning over again or rest number of situps without dress. ( full naked )(only male student but sometimes female students).The timer can be set as below for prescribed numbers of situps. 
30—only 45 second
50—less than 2 minutes
100—less than 4 minutes
200—less than 9 minutes
250—less than 12 minutes
300—less than 14 minutes
400—less than 19 minutes
500—less than 30 minutes ( very severe)
And
1000–1hour and 15 minutes only ( very very severe)
This punishment is only male student.

Female student.. 
Timer can be set as below for prescribed number of situps. 
30—less than 1 minutes
50—less than 2 minutes and 30 second. 
100–5 minutes. 
200–12 minutes. 
300–20 minutes. 
400–30 minutes. 
500–45 minutes. 
1000–2 hours.

Continuous non-stop sit-ups
He/She  has to do sit-ups non-stop and continuously (strictly monitored and caned  to avoid any cheating, (slow down or stopping) )until the punisher feels he/she has suffered sufficiently and instructed to stop.It is a very painful punishment.
(Minimum 200 situps)

'Science Behind This' 
According to a study published in International Journal of Science and Consciousness, this is a type of exercise proven to improve cognitive function of the brain and its development when the children do sit-ups holding their ears in criss-cross manner. This is an exercise for brain to improve memory. In ancient days of India, this exercise used to be prescribed to students in the form of a punishment when they commit mistakes. In vedic culture, students were given punishments which eventually benefit them with physical and psychological development.'''

See also 
Squat (exercise)
Sit-up
Naked punishment

References 

 
 
 
 

Punishments
South Asia